Cleja is a commune in Bacău County, Western Moldavia, Romania. It is composed of three villages: Cleja, Somușca (Somoska) and Valea Mică (Pokolpatak).

In 2011, the commune had a population of 6621: 94.41% ethnic Romanians, 2.43% Hungarians and Csangos. At the 2002 census, 97.8% of residents were Roman Catholic, 1.6% Romanian Orthodox and 0.2% Pentecostal.

References

Communes in Bacău County
Localities in Western Moldavia